Darren Wright may refer to:

 Darren Wright (rugby league) (born 1968), English rugby league player
 Darren Wright (footballer, born 1968),  English footballer
 Darren Wright (footballer, born 1979),  English footballer